The formal fallacy of the modal fallacy is a special type of fallacy that occurs in modal logic. It is the fallacy of placing a proposition in the wrong modal scope, most commonly confusing the scope of what is necessarily true. A statement is considered necessarily true if and only if it is impossible for the statement to be untrue and that there is no situation that would cause the statement to be false. Some philosophers further argue that a necessarily true statement must be true in all possible worlds.

The modal fallacy occurs when there is a confusion of the distinction between the two.

Description
In modal logic, there is an important distinction between what is logically necessary to be true and what is true but not logically necessary to be so. In the first statement,  is true given  but is not logically necessary to be so.

A common example in everyday life might be the following:
 Mickey Mouse is the President of the United States.
 The President is at least 35 years old.
 Thus, Mickey Mouse is necessarily 35 years or older.

Why is this false? 

The conclusion is false, since, even though Mickey Mouse is over 35 years old, there is no logical necessity for him to be. Even though it is certainly true in this world, a possible world can exist in which Mickey Mouse is not yet 35 years old. If instead of adding a stipulation of necessity, the argument just concluded that Mickey Mouse is 35 or older, it would be valid.

Norman Swartz gave the following example of how the modal fallacy can lead one to conclude that the future is already set, regardless of one's decisions; this is based on the "sea battle" example used by Aristotle to discuss the problem of future contingents in his On Interpretation:Two admirals, A and B, are preparing their navies for a sea battle tomorrow. The battle will be fought until one side is victorious. But the 'laws' of the excluded middle (no third truth-value) and of non-contradiction (not both truth-values), mandate that one of the propositions, 'A wins' and 'B wins', is true (always has been and ever will be) and the other is false (always has been and ever will be). Suppose 'A wins' is today true. Then whatever A does (or fails to do) today will make no difference; similarly, whatever B does (or fails to do) today will make no difference: the outcome is already settled. Or again, suppose 'A wins' is today false. Then no matter what A does today (or fails to do), it will make no difference; similarly, no matter what B does (or fails to do), it will make no difference: the outcome is already settled. Thus, if propositions bear their truth-values timelessly (or unchangingly and eternally), then planning, or as Aristotle put it 'taking care', is illusory in its efficacy. It is true here that only one of the statements "A wins" or "B wins" must be true. In logic syntax, this is equivalent to

Thus, one believes that, since one of both events is logically necessarily true, no action by either can change the outcome.

Swartz also argued that the argument from free will suffers from the modal fallacy.

References

Modal logic
Non-classical logic
Philosophical logic
Formal fallacies